The Snov is a river in Bryansk Oblast in Russia and Chernihiv Oblast in Ukraine, right tributary of the Desna River (Dnieper basin). 

The length of the river is 253 km. The area of its drainage basin is 8,700 km2. The Snov freezes up in November - late January and stays icebound until March - early April. Part of the river forms the Russia–Ukraine border.

According to Ruthenian chronicles, in 1068 at Snov River took place a battle between Duke of Chernihiv Sviatoslav Yaroslavich and Cumans led by their Duke Sharukan.

Cities and towns on the Snov 

 Chernihiv, Ukraine

References

Further reading

External links
 Snov. Kolokray.

Rivers of Bryansk Oblast
Rivers of Chernihiv
Rivers of Chernihiv Oblast
Russia–Ukraine border
Tourist attractions in Chernihiv
Tourist attractions in Chernihiv Oblast
Tourism in Chernihiv